Arvid Vatle (born 23 November 1938) is a Norwegian medical doctor and winner of the 1999 Ig Nobel Prize in Medicine. He won the prize for his research in the containers used by his patients to deliver urine samples.

He was born in Voss, and took his medical education in West Berlin in 1963. In 1981 he took the doctorate in the history of medicine, again in West Germany. He settled in Sagvåg, working as a physician.

References

1938 births
Living people
20th-century Norwegian physicians
People from Voss